Grau is a common surname used in Catalan and German, meaning respectively "grade", coming from the Latin word gradus, or "gray".

People

 Agustí Grau (1893–1964), Spanish (Catalan) composer
 Albin Grau (1884–1971), German artist, architect and occultist
 Alexander Grau (born 1973), German racing driver
 Benjamin Grau (born 1945), Spanish (Catalan) former motorcycle racer
 Dieter Grau (1913–2014), German rocket scientist
 Doris Grau (1924–1995), American actress, script supervisor and voice actress
 Emili Prats Grau (born 1946) Andorran politician
 Emilio Grau Sala (1911–1975), Spanish (Catalan) artist
 Enrique Grau (1920–2004), Colombian artist
 Eulàlia Grau (born 1946), Spanish (Catalan) artist
 Francisco Grau (born 1947), Spanish musician
 Fritz Grau (1894–?), German athlete
 Hugo Grau (1899–1984), German biologist
 Jacinto Grau (1877–1958), Spanish playwright
 Jeff Grau (born 1979), American former football player
 Joan Carretero i Grau (born 1955), Spanish (Catalan) politician
 Jorge Grau (1930–2018), Spanish (Catalan) director, scriptwriter, playwright and painter
 José Sanchis Grau (1932–2011), Spanish comic book writer
 Lester W. Grau (life-dates unknown), American military writer
 Lorenzo Batlle y Grau (1810–1887), President of Uruguay from 1868–1872
 Martin Grau (born 1992), German steeplechase runner
 Miguel Grau Seminario (1834–1879), Peruvian naval officer
 Olga Grau (born 1945), Chilean writer, professor, philosopher
 Oliver Grau (born 1965), German art historian
 Polita Grau (1915–2000), former First Lady of Cuba
 Ramón Grau (1881–1969), President of Cuba 1933–34 and 1944–48
 Raúl Cubas Grau (born 1943), President of Paraguay, 1998–1999
 Roberto Grau (1900–1944), Argentine chess player
 Roberto Diego Grau (born 1970), Argentine former rugby player
 Santiago Grau (born 1963), Spanish (Catalan) former field hockey player
 Shirley Ann Grau (1929–2020), American writer
 Vicente Grau Juan (born 1968), Spanish athlete
 Jaume Grau (born 1997), Spanish footballet

Surnames
Catalan-language surnames
German-language surnames
Surnames from nicknames